The Happy Family is a 1936 British comedy film directed by Maclean Rogers and starring Hugh Williams, Leonora Corbett and Max Adrian. The film was based on the play French Salad by Max Catto.

The plot concerns a mother and father who, in order to shock their extended family out of their idle, spendthrift ways, pretend to have lost all their money.

Cast
 Hugh Williams - Victor Hutt
 Leonora Corbett - Barbara Hutt
 Max Adrian - Noel Hutt
 Maidie Hope - Mrs Hutt
 Eve Gray - Nia Harrison
 Ellen Pollock - Leo Hutt
 Glennis Lorimer - Robina Hutt
 D. A. Clarke-Smith - Mr Harrison
 Dick Francis - Mr Hutt
 Muriel George - Housekeeper

References

Bibliography
 Shafer, Stephen C. British popular films, 1929-1939: The Cinema of Reassurance. Routledge, 1997.

External links

1936 films
1936 comedy films
Films directed by Maclean Rogers
British comedy films
British black-and-white films
1930s English-language films
1930s British films